Veronica Zorzi (born 20 October 1980) is an Italian professional golfer.

Zorzi was born in Verona. She turned professional in 2000 and joined the Ladies European Tour (LET) in 2001. She won her first LET title in 2005 at the Vediorbis Open de France Dames, and she ended that year third on the LET Order of Merit. She successfully defended her Open de France title in 2006.

Ladies European Tour wins
2005 Vediorbis Open de France Dames
2006 Vediorbis Open de France Dames

Team appearances
Amateur

 Espirito Santo Trophy (representing Italy): 2000

Professional
World Cup (representing Italy): 2006, 2007

External links

Italian female golfers
Ladies European Tour golfers
Sportspeople from Verona
1980 births
Living people